Nature is a wildlife television program produced by Thirteen/WNET New York.  It has been distributed to United States public television stations by the PBS television service since its debut on October 10, 1982. Some episodes may appear in syndication on many PBS member stations around the United States and Canada, and on the Discovery Channel. This series currently airs on Wednesday on PBS.

It is a weekly one-hour program that consists of documentaries about various animals and ecosystems. The on-camera host of the first season was Donald Johanson, with voice-over narration by George Page. Starting with the 1983 season, George Page became both the on-camera host and the narrator until the series' 19th season in 2000. Since then, Academy Award winner F. Murray Abraham has frequently narrated episodes, as has ecologist Chris Morgan.

The program uses a silhouette of a camel thorn tree as its logo.

Nominations and awards 

Nature has been nominated for 22 Emmy Awards, winning 8 during its longevity. In 1986, host George Page was nominated for best Outstanding Individual Achievements in Informational Programming. In 1988 and 1989, it won two Emmy Awards for best Outstanding Informational Series. In 2000, it was nominated for best Outstanding Main Title Design. The episode "Silence of the Bees" won a Peabody Award in 2007.

Reception 
Nature has received generally positive reviews from television critics. Linda Stasi of New York Post called it, "A wonderful, remarkable show. Don’t miss it." David Bianculli of TV Worth Watching called the miniseries "Attenborough's Life Stories", "Beautiful and inspiring." Kaitlin Milligan of Broadway World wrote, "Awe-inspiring."

Episodes

In other media

Comic book 
Three issues of a Nature comic book were produced from 2006–2008. They were full-color corollaries to on-air episodes like "Silence of the Bees," "In the Valley of the Wolves," and "The Beauty of Ugly." Nature Comics was targeted at pre-teens and teenagers as an educational tool, and was distributed for free to museums, schools, and nature centers.

Nature Comics featured the talents of a number of notable cartoonists, including Josh Neufeld, Rick Veitch, Lauren Weinstein, and Thomas Yeates. The series was edited by David Reisman.

Nature Comics #2 was given an Association of Educational Publishers 2008 Distinguished Achievement Award (in the Specialized Audience Instruction/Graphic Novel category).

Issues 
Nature Comics #1 (2006) — related episodes: "Christmas in Yellowstone" (Season 23), "Penguins of the Antarctic" (Season 23), and "Chimpanzees: An Unnatural History" (Season 23)
 Mark Schultz (cover art)
 Jonathan Bennett
 Rick Veitch
 Lauren Weinstein
 R. Kikuo Johnson
 Sabrina Jones

Nature Comics #2 (2007) — related episodes: "Silence of the Bees" (Season 24), "In the Valley of the Wolves" (Season 24), and "The Beauty of Ugly" (Season 24)
 Rick Veitch
 Lauren Weinstein
 R. Kikuo Johnson (cover art and inside story)
 Thomas Yeates
 Josh Neufeld
 Jeffrey Lewis

The Unexpected World of Nature (a.k.a. Nature Comics #3) (2008) — related episodes: "The Dragon Chronicles" (Season 25), "The Wolf That Changed America" (Season 25), and "Frogs: The Thin Green Line" (Season 25)
 Rick Veitch (cover and inside story)
 Thomas Yeates
 Sabrina Jones
 R. Kikuo Johnson
 Lauren Weinstein
 Hope Larson
 Josh Neufeld

References

External links
 
 
 
 Nature Comics official website
 Nature Comics free PDFs: #1, #2, #3

1982 American television series debuts
1980s American documentary television series
1990s American documentary television series
2000s American documentary television series
2010s American documentary television series
2020s American documentary television series
Television series by WNET
Documentary films about nature
English-language television shows
Nature educational television series
Television series about mammals
Television series about birds
Television series about arthropods
Television series about fish
Television series about reptiles and amphibians
Discovery Channel original programming